The 1986 World Field Archery Championships were held in Radstadt, Austria.

Medal summary (Men's individual)

Medal summary (Women's individual)

Medal summary (Mixed team)

Medal summary (Junior Men's individual)

References

E
1986 in Austrian sport
International archery competitions hosted by Austria
World Field Archery Championships